The Peachtree Creek Greenway trail is a multi-use trail under construction along the North Fork Peachtree Creek in and near Atlanta, Georgia, United States, which will traverse the cities of Atlanta, Brookhaven, Chamblee, Doraville and parts of Unincorporated Dekalb County. Once complete, it will connect 12 miles from the Atlanta Beltline trails and Path 400 northward up to I-285. Some landmarks along the route will include Silverback stadium, Mercer University, CHOA & Emory and multiple schools and libraries.

Groundbreaking was in early 2018. It will be considered an alternate (non-auto) transportation route. In December 2019, the first "Model Mile" was open to the public in Brookhaven.The path of the Greenway follows alongside the North Fork Peachtree Creek. Significant clean-up of the creek has included the removal of 30 truck loads of trash and over 200 tires in addition to many invasive species of foliage.

History
While the Greenway is expected to increase business revenue along the mostly immigrant Buford Highway corridor (BuHi district) there is concern about the effect of increased property value on affordable housing surrounding the greenway. Controversy has risen in regards to gentrification along the corridor. Anticipation for the Peachtree Creek Greenway has already caused the median gross rent to rise by 22.9%. The City of Brookhaven has been awarded $2.7 million in federal funds towards the project through the Atlanta Regional Commission. In 2017 The City of Brookhaven attempted to take 19 acres of land for the Peachtree Creek Greenway through eminent domain. In March 2018 a Dekalb County Superior Court Judge ruled against Brookhaven, calling it an illegal "bad faith" deal.

The first section of the greenway opened on December 12, 2019 officially.

Points of interest
Section 1 (completed, 2018–2019, Opened December 2019) 

 Mile 3.0, Elevation 826 ft., Southern terminus of section, North Druid Hills Rd.,parking, Salvation Army
 Mile 3.22, Corporate Blvd., parking
 Mile 3.44, Corporate Square, southern end of bridge over Peachtree Creek
 Mile 3.56, gate to Jackson Square Condominiums, northern end of bridge over Peachtree Creek
 Mile 3.68, gate to Villas at Druid Hills
 Mile 3.96, maintenance facility
 Mile 4.27, Elevation 844 ft., Northern terminus of section, Briarwood Rd., parking

Section 2 (proposed)

 Northeast Plaza
 Fisher Trail Park

Section 3 (proposed)

 Avenues 85 Apartments
 Echo Ridge Swim & Tennis Club
 Globe Academy
 5 East Apartments
 Seven Springs Apartments
 Clairmont Terrace
 McDaniel School Park
 The Brooke Apartments
 St. Pius X Catholic High School
 The Historical Mill
 Publix

Section 4 (proposed)

 Century Peachtree Creek Apartments
 Henderson Mill Creek
 Regal Cinemas Hollywood 24
 Mercer University

Section 5 (proposed)

 Embry Hills
 Stone Summit Climbing and Fitness Center
 Atlanta Silverbacks Park

See also
Cycling infrastructure
10-Minute Walk
Smart growth
Walkability

References

External links
 

Hiking trails in Atlanta
Bike paths in Georgia (U.S. state)
Urban planning in Georgia (U.S. state)
Transportation in Atlanta
Transportation in Brookhaven, Georgia
Transportation in DeKalb County, Georgia
 
Chamblee, Georgia
Doraville, Georgia